The following is a list of the television networks and announcers to have broadcast the American Bowl, which was a series of National Football League pre-season exhibition games that were held at sites outside the United States between 1986 and 2005. Out of the list, ESPN hosted the America Bowl the most times, with NBC coming second.

2000s

1990s

1980s

ABC Sports
CBS Sports
Fox Sports announcers
Football on NBC
ESPN announcers
Lists of National Football League announcers
Broadcasters